Mu Ceti (μ Ceti) is a star in the constellation Cetus. The combined apparent magnitude of the system is +4.27, and it is located 84 light-years from the Sun.

Consequently, the Chinese name for Mu Ceti itself is "the Fourth Star of Circular Celestial Granary".

Mu Ceti is an A9 giant star. It has been suspected to be a δ Scuti variable, but most studies find it to be of constant brightness.

Three companions were all discovered during occultations of Mu Ceti by the Moon. An orbit was derived for the brightest with a period of 1,202 days. Later studies have failed to find any evidence of these companions.

References 

Cetus (constellation)
Cetus, Mu
Cetus, Mu
Ceti, 87
012828
4
0123
017094
Durchmusterung objects
Delta Scuti variables